This article shows the 2017 season of South Korean football.

National team results

Senior team

Under-23 team

K League

K League Classic

K League Challenge

Promotion-relegation playoffs
The promotion-relegation playoffs were held between the winners of the 2017 K League Challenge playoffs and the 11th-placed club of the 2017 K League Classic. The winner on aggregate score after both matches earned entry into the 2018 K League 1.

1–1 on aggregate. Sangju Sangmu won 5–4 on penalties and therefore both clubs remain in their respective leagues.

Korean FA Cup

Korea National League

WK League

Table

Playoff and championship

AFC Champions League

See also
Football in South Korea

References

External links

 
Seasons in South Korean football